One of the most profitable aspects of the Royal Canadian Mint (RCM) is its numismatic product line. The first numismatic coin from the RCM was arguably the 1935 dollar commemorating the Silver Jubilee of His Majesty King George V. Though intended for circulation, it was the first Canadian coin commemorating an event. The decision to issue this coin was made in October 1934 by then-Prime Minister R.B. Bennett. There were economic and patriotic motivations for the release of a silver dollar, including a hope to boost the silver mining industry. In future years, the silver dollar would have a more emotional meaning for many Canadians because it was also the first coin to have the Voyageur motif on its reverse.

Olympic coins
One of the earliest numismatic collection was the Olympic Five and Ten Dollar coins for the 1976 Montreal Olympics. Starting in 1973, the RCM issued four coin sets (two five dollar coins and two ten dollar coins). At the behest of the Federal Government, led by then-Prime Minister Pierre Elliott Trudeau, it was agreed that these coins would help finance while commemorate the 1976 Summer Olympics. The plan was to have thirty coins, twenty-eight silver coins with face values of $5 and $10, and two gold coins with face values of $100.  They are the first of the Modern Olympic coins with face values of one hundred dollars.  Due to the incredibly high mintage (over 20 million coins were produced), these coins have no investment value whatsoever. Most of these coins today are usually sold for their silver content.

After the Olympic coin venture, the numismatic line expanded to include $100 Gold coins. These were premium coins that sold for higher than face value. The common issue price from 1977 to 1979 ranged from $140 to $180. The cases for these coins tended to be brown or black leatherette cases with maroon or blue inserts, and a Certificate of Authenticity. Of all these coins, the only one that had any significant increase in value on the secondary market was the 2002 Alberta Strikes Oil coin.

Heading into the 1980s, the Olympics would return to Canada. The city of Calgary would host the 1988 Winter Olympics. Starting in 1985, the Federal Government, under the leadership of then-Prime Minister Brian Mulroney, issued a ten coin set to help finance and commemorate the Olympic games. These coins were issued in Proof quality only, and were sold with the partnership of the Royal Bank of Canada. Part of the agreement with Royal Bank was that these coins could be redeemed for their face value. Unlike the Montreal coins, mintage was limited to 5,000,000 coins and this would mark the first time that any silver coin had edge lettering on it. Said lettering was 'XV OLYMPIC WINTER GAMES - JEUX D'OLYMPIQUES D'HIVER.'

On February 23, 2007, the Royal Canadian Mint held a press conference in Calgary, Alberta to announce the release of the Vancouver Olympic commemorative coins. The newest denomination for the Vancouver Olympic coins is twenty-five dollars. The twenty-five dollar coins are the first Modern Olympic coins ever to have a hologram on the reverse.

Birth of luxury coins

Expansion in the numismatic line was a key element of the 1990s. The first significant sign was the birth of the Two Hundred Dollar Gold coins. Starting in 1990, this coin was sold for a higher price than its face value. The first coin commemorated the Silver Jubilee of Canada's flag and sold for $395.00. The superstar of this collection would be the Canadian Native Cultures and Traditions coins. These coins were minted from 1997 to 2000. The Haida coin has been an award-winning coin for the RCM taking the Best Coin Award at the 1997 Singapore International Coin Show.

This was only the beginning for the RCM. The advent of the Two Hundred Dollar Gold series was quickly joined by a Platinum series. These high quality collector coins solidified the RCM's entry into the luxury coin market. A four coin set with face values of $30, $75, $150, and $300 respectively were complemented by the high quality artwork that adorned these luxury items. Famed artists such as Robert Bateman and Glen Loates contributed to these collections with polar bear and bird designs. The issue price for these collections was around $1,990 and the casing was a walnut or burgundy (for 1994) case with a black suede four hole insert and a Certificate of Authenticity.

Expansion and innovation

A long overdue project was launched in 1995 when 50-cent coins became part of the numismatic line. For decades, 50-cent coins were part of the standard sets but were never really marketed as their own numismatic product. Truly a favourite among collectors, the Discovering Nature Series marked the first numismatic coins with a face value of 50 cents. Marketed as a 32-coin set with one set released on an annual basis, the decade would close with another 50-cent series. A coin set to honour Canadian sports first was released.

The decade also saw the birth of several new coin series which used innovative techniques that had never been before. These techniques were the use of a gold cameo in the coin. The first set that was part of this great innovation was the Aviation Collection, which debuted in 1990. The Canadian aviation heroes were commemorated on a 20-coin set. Every coin in the collection consisted of a 24-karat, gold-covered oval cameo portrait of an aviation hero—a first for the Royal Canadian Mint. The coin itself featured a different plane ranging from the Gypsy Moth to the legendary Avro Arrow. These were proof coins while the case of issue was an aluminum case in the shape of a wing.

A new coin series which not only increased awareness in the RCM but acknowledged Canada's cultural differences was launched near the end of the decade. The Chinese Lunar New Year Collection debuted in 1998 with the Year of the Tiger coin. The centre featured the fierce Tiger in a gold plated cameo while the rim found the Tiger surrounded by all twelve animal zodiacs. All the images from this collection are courtesy of artist Harvey Chan. With a face value of $15, this set ended in 2009 with the Year of the Ox.

In 1999, the Mint celebrated twenty years of the $100 Maple Leaf coin by issuing coins with a hologram, struck directly onto the coin's surface, rather than as a separate step.

Chinese Lunar New Year Coin Series

Commemorative Silver Dollar Series

1935-1980

1981-1999

1981 was the first year that the RCM issued two different qualities of silver dollars. One version was the Proof, which composed of a frosted relief against a parallel lined background. The second version was the Brilliant Uncirculated. The finish is classified as a brilliant relief on a brilliant background.

Numismatic One and Five Cents

Numismatic Ten Cents

Numismatic 25-cent Pieces

Numismatic Fifty-Cent Collections

Discovering Nature Series

90th Anniversary of Royal Canadian Mint

Canadian Sports Series

Source:

Numismatic Five Dollars

Five Dollars

Twenty Dollars

Aviation Collection

The collection consists of 20 coins in all, with two coins being released annually over a period of 10 years, starting in 1990 and concluding in 1999, the 90th anniversary of powered flight in Canada.  They were also offered in two presentation sets of 10 coins each—Series 1: 1990–94; and Series 2: 1995–99. Each coin has a face value of $20, is composed of sterling silver (92.5% silver, 7.5% copper); and includes a 24-karat gold-covered cameo depicting a Canadian aviation pioneer. Weight:  31.103 grams;  Diameter: 38mm;  Edge Type: Interrupted Serration;  Finish: Proof. The obverse on all 20 coins features the portrait of Her Majesty Queen Elizabeth II by Dora de Pédery-Hunt.

The 1998 coins were offered in a special gift box with two cardboard models of the Argus and the Waterbomber.

100 Dollar Gold
The text "CANADA" appears on the edge for the first time in Canadian coinage.

200 Dollar Gold

Celebrating Canadian Native Cultures and Traditions

350 Dollar Gold

Provincial Flowers

Platinum coins

Definition of finishes
Bullion
Brilliant relief against a parallel lined background.
Proof
Frosted relief against a mirror background
Specimen
Brilliant relief on a satin background.

Mint marks
A
Used on 2005 Palladium Test Coin to signify the coins were struck from Lot A.
B
Used on 2005 Palladium Test Coin to signify the coins were struck from Lot B.
C
Placed on sovereigns produced at the Ottawa branch of the Royal Mint, between 1908 and 1919.
Dot
In December 1936, King Edward VIII abdicated the throne in favour of his brother, who would become King George VI. The problem was that the Royal Mint was designing the effigy of King Edward VIII and now a new effigy would need to be created. The 1, 10 and 25 cent pieces in 1937 would be struck from dies with a 1936 date on the reverse. To distinguish that these coins were issued in 1937, a Dot Mint Mark was placed on the 1936 dies, and could be found beneath the year. These coins fulfilled demand for coins until new coinage tools with the effigy of King George VI were ready. While the 10 and 25 cent coins are more common, the 1 cent coins are rare, with about a half-dozen known to exist.
H
Used to identify coins that were struck for Canada by the Birmingham Mint, also known as the Heaton Mint, until 1907.
Innukshuk
All circulation coins for the 2010 Vancouver Olympics have the Innukshuk Mint Mark on the Obverse of the coin.
International Polar Year
The obverse of the 2007 International Polar Year $20 Numismatic Coin has the logo for the International Polar Year on the obverse of the coin.
Maple Leaf
All coins with a Maple Leaf Mint Mark were struck in 1948 due to an emergency with coin toolage. The granting of India’s independence resulted in the removal of IND:IMP (meaning Emperor of India) from King George VI’s effigy. Due to the demand for circulation coins in 1948, coins for 1948 could not be struck until the new tools were received. The new tools would have the IND:IMP removed from them. In the meanwhile, coins were produced in 1948 with a year of 1947 on them. A small Maple Leaf Mint Mark was struck beside 1947 on the reverse of all coins to signify the year of production.
P
From 2001-2006, most one cent, five cents, ten cents, twenty-five cents, and fifty cents issued for circulation were struck with a P Mint Mark to represent the Royal Canadian Mint’s plating process.
Paralympic Logo
All circulation coins for the 2010 Vancouver Paralympic Games have the Paralympic Games logo on the Obverse of the coin.
RCM Logo
At the CNA Convention in July 2006, the RCM unveiled its new Mint Mark to be used on all circulation and numismatic coinage. The agenda behind the implementation of this new Mint Mark was to help increase the RCM’s image as a brand. The aim of the logo is to educate coin users and coin collectors, respectively, that the RCM is minting Canada’s coins. The first Circulation Coin to have this new Mint Mark is the 10th Anniversary Two-Dollar coin. The first Numismatic Coin to have this new Mint Mark is the Snowbirds Coin and Stamp Set.
T/É
In an effort to push the standard of quality higher, the RCM started to experiment with a gold bullion coin that would have a purity of 99.999%. The result was a Gold Maple Leaf Test Bullion coin with the Mint Mark of T/É (to signify Test/Épreuve). The date on the obverse of the coin was 2007 and it had a mintage of 500.
Teddy Bear
When the RCM released its Baby Lullabies and CD Set, a sterling silver one dollar coin was included in the set. The one dollar coin included a mint mark of a teddy bear.
W
Used occasionally on specimen sets produced in Winnipeg, starting in 1998.
W/P
Used on the Special Edition Uncirculated Set of 2003. The W mint mark stated that the coin was produced in Winnipeg and the P states that the coins are plated.

See also
 Canadian Silver Maple Leaf
 Royal Canadian Mint Olympic Coins
 Royal Canadian Mint numismatic coins (2000s)

References

 Charlton Standard Catalogue of Canadian Coins, 60th Edition, 2006, W.K. Cross

External links
 Royal Canadian Mint's Official Website
 Royal Canadian Mint Act
 Royal Canadian Numismatic Association
 Numismatic Network Canada
 Canadian Coin News

Numismatic, 20th century

fr:Monnaie royale canadienne